is a 1985 Japanese film directed by Nobuhiko Obayashi.

Summary
Lonely highschool boy Hiroki Inoue is fascinated by one girl but another mysterious girl comes into his life. Is she real or a dream from his lonely heart?

Cast
Toshinori Omi as Hiroki Inoue
Yasuko Tomita as Sabishinbou and Yuriko Tachibana
Yumiko Fujita as Tatsuko Inoue
Nenji Kobayashi as Michiaki Inoue
Kirin Kiki as Terue Amano
Satomi Kobayashi as Yukimi Amano
Kumeko Urabe as Fuki Inoue
Ittoku Kishibe as Tetsu Yoshida
Makoto Satō as Principal Okamoto

Awards
7th Yokohama Film Festival 
 4th Best Film

References

External links

Lonely Heart at the Japanese Movie Database 

1985 films
Films directed by Nobuhiko Obayashi
Japanese fantasy films
Japanese romance films
1980s Japanese-language films
Films about pianos and pianists
1980s Japanese films